Hazara Restaurant was a restaurant in Hazara situated in the outskirts of Quetta, Balochistan, Pakistan. It was founded in 2017 by Hamida Ali Hazara, who is also the founder of Hurmatty Niswa Foundation, a non-profit organization geared towards helping Hazara women.

The restaurant was closed in 2018.

Background 
Hazara opened her restaurant in order to provide local women with a meeting place, and to offer employment to women from the Hazara minority group, which has faced widespread persecution. Although the focus was on offering a space for women, men were allowed to dine there in the evenings.

References

Restaurants in Pakistan
Quetta District